John Fontaine (1792-1866) was an American plantation owner and politician. He served as the first Mayor of Columbus, Georgia from 1836 to 1837. He defended Columbus during the Creek War of 1836.

Biography

Early life
John Fontaine was born in 1792.

Career
He was a steamboat owner and cotton merchant. He was also a large plantation owner.

He served as the first Mayor of Columbus, Georgia from 1836 to 1837. He defended the town during the Creek War of 1836, with the help of Governor William Schley. He used Creek informants to spy and report on their planned attacks.

Personal life
He married Mary Ann (Stewart) Fontaine (1808-1852). They had six children:
Henrietta Fontaine (1827-1857).
Mary Elizabeth Fontaine (1835-unknown). 
Benjamin Bruton Fontaine (1838-1870).
Theophilus Fontaine (1842-1896).
Francis Fontaine (1844-1901).
George H. Fontaine (1850-1904).

Death
He died in 1866.

Legacy
His son, Francis Fontaine, who inherited and managed his plantations, became a newspaper editor, poet and novelist.
His portrait, painted by Edward Ludlow Mooney (1813-1887), can be found at the Columbus Museum in Columbus, Georgia.

References

1792 births
1866 deaths
Mayors of Columbus, Georgia
American planters
American slave owners
19th-century American politicians